John Abbot Goodwin was a U.S. educator, journalist, author and politician who served as a member, and from 1860 to 1861, as the Speaker of the Massachusetts House of Representatives.

Family life
Goodwin was the brother of American writer Jane G. Austin.  Goodwin married Martha Fisher of Sudbury, Massachusetts, they had a son, William Bradford Goodwin.

Teaching career
Goodwin was a teacher for many years and authored the book The Pilgrim Republic: An historical review of the colony of New Plymouth, which was well received upon its publication.  Goodwin was for a time the superintendent of schools of Lawrence, Massachusetts.

Journalist career
Goodwin was involved in the management of the Lawrence Courier. In 1854 Goodwin moved to Lowell to take over the running of the Lowell Courier. After working for a year at the Courier Goodwin became the editor of the Lowell Daily Citizen and News.  Goodwin spent two tears as editor of the Daily Citizen and News.

Public service career
Goodwin was a member of the Lowell Board of Aldermen for two years, and spent ten consecutive years as a member of the Lowell School Committee.  Goodwin was a member of the Massachusetts House of Representatives in 1857 and 1859 to 1861, serving as House Speaker for his last two years.

Lowell Postmaster
On April 12, 1861 Goodwin received an appointment from President Lincoln to the position of postmaster of Lowell, a position that he held for thirteen years.

Death and burial
Goodwin died on September 24, 1884, he was buried in the cemetery in south Sudbury, Massachusetts

References

External Links
 The Pilgrim Republic: An historical review of the colony of New Plymouth

Speakers of the Massachusetts House of Representatives
Members of the Massachusetts House of Representatives
19th-century American people
1824 births
1884 deaths
People from Lawrence, Massachusetts
People from Lowell, Massachusetts
People from Sterling, Massachusetts
Massachusetts city council members
American male journalists
19th-century American newspaper editors
19th-century American politicians
Burials in Massachusetts
School board members in Massachusetts
19th-century American male writers